Russian Dressing is a 1933 short theatrical cartoon by Columbia Pictures, featuring Krazy Kat.

Plot
Krazy is on a horse-drawn sleigh, riding through the countryside, and playing a balalaika. He then stops at a house, and sings the Russian song Dark Eyes to serenade someone. Coming out of the house is Krazy's spaniel girlfriend. They would then walk around and sing the song together.

Krazy and the spaniel enter the house, which turns out to be a tavern, where they do the Cossack dance. It is a pleasant experience for them. Meanwhile, a hefty hog drinks an entire bottle of vodka, thus becoming intoxicated and psychologically corrupted. The hog nabs Krazy and tells him to blow up "the palace" with a round black bomb. Krazy, at first resists, but is compelled by the hog who is heavily armed.

Krazy jigs out of the tavern while holding the bomb. He tries to hurl it at a distance but animals in the vicinity, such as dogs and birds, keep throwing it back. Not liking what the cat is doing, the hog engages with Krazy in volleying the bomb back and forth. The bomb finally detonates at the hog who then runs off in a barrel. Krazy and the spaniel go on to celebrate by doing the Cossack dance outside and kissing.

See also
 Krazy Kat filmography

References

External links
Russian Dressing at the Big Cartoon Database

1933 short films
1933 animated films
American black-and-white films
Columbia Pictures short films
Krazy Kat shorts
Films set in Russia
1930s animated short films
1930s American animated films
Animated films about dogs
Columbia Pictures animated short films
Screen Gems short films